Kim Si-seup (1435–1493) was a Korean scholar and author.

Background
Kim Si-seup's ancestors originally came from Gangneung, Gangwon-do.  His family was from the yangban class and Kim himself was born in Seoul.

Throughout his life, Kim maintained a special bond with the Gangwon area and compiled a book of poetry called Tangyugwandongnok which was based on family history and experiences he had in the area. Kim was an extremely gifted child and had picked up reading ability at eight months of age. At five years of age, he was able to read and comprehend The Great Learning and the Doctrine of the Mean. Kim was a devout Buddhist and at twenty-one years of age protesting King Sejo usurping of the throne from his nephew Danjong of Joseon (eventually murdering him), he decided to skip government service and become a Buddhist monk.

Works
Kim wrote the first novel in Classical chinese in Korea, titled Geumo Sinhwa (금오신화; 金鰲新話), as well as other books such as Siphyeondamyohae, Tangyugwanseorok, and Tangyuhonamnok. Geumo Sinhwa (New stories from Mount Geumo) was likely composed at Yongjang Temple during the reign of King Sejong and became an instant classic. Although Geumosinhwa was influenced by a Chinese novel titled Jiandeng Xinhua (New stories while trimming the lampwick) by Qu You, it would become nativized.

Another characteristic lies in his own writing. He did not prefer only Confucianism and tried to deal with Buddhism. It appeared in several books of his that the king and subjects should respect the whole nation regardless of a person's status and origin. It was believed his thought was much advanced compared to the era in which he lived and remained one of the earliest ideas concerning democracy on the Korean peninsula.

When he died there was a government effort to find and preserve all of his works, which number around 30 volumes. Below is an example of his poetry:

Do not sweep the fallen leaves,
For they are pleasant to hear on clear nights
In the wind, they rustle, as if sighing;
In the moonlight, their shadows flutter.
They knock on the window to wake a traveler;
Covering stairs, they hide moss.
Sad, the sight of them getting wet in the rain;
Let them wither away deep in the mountains.

See also
 Korean Literature
 Gangwon

References

External links
 
 
 

1435 births
1493 deaths
Joseon Buddhist monks
Korean Taoists
15th-century Korean philosophers
Korean writers